Denis Majstorović (born 23 June 1989) is a Croatian-born Italian rugby union player.
He is a versatile player and as such can be used as a utility back covering most positions in the backline, but plays mostly at centre or on the wing.

His current team is Rugby Rovigo Delta, having previously played for Aironi and Rugby Club I Cavalieri Prato.

He plays for Italy A. He was selected for Italy's training squad in preparation to face the touring Southern Hemisphere teams in November 2010.

References

External links
hosted.stats.com Profile
ERC Stats Profile

1989 births
Living people
Italian rugby union players
Italian people of Croatian descent
Cavalieri Prato players
Aironi players
Rugby union wings
Rugby union centres
Valorugby Emilia players